Hsiung-Zee Wong (born October 24, 1947) is a composer, artist, and designer who was born in Hong Kong. She moved to the United States in 1966, where she worked as a freelance graphic designer and illustrator. Wong studied at the University of Hawaii until 1968. In 1970, she studied electronic music at Mills College with Robert Sheff (later known as Gene Tyranny) and Dane Rudhyar. In 1972, she studied industrial design at the California College of Arts and Crafts. Other teachers included Ernst Krenek, Chou Wen-Chung,  Leonard Klein and Robert Ashley.  In 1972, Wong presented an art exhibit entitled "A Celebration of Women" at the Intersection Gallery (probably Intersection for the Arts).

Wong founded Hysteresis, a women's creative arts group that included Bay-area artists, at Mills College. She also performed with the Flowing Stream Ensemble. Wong's compositions include:

Electronic 
Cry of Women in the Wilderness (piano, gong, and amplified Zen bell; 1972)
Earth Rituals (tape with chanting and sound improvisation; 1973)
Maturity (taped piano improvisation; 1972)
Sounding of the Sane (tape with audience chanting)

Guitar 
Artsongs and Ballads

Multimedia 
They Move, Don't They? (sound calligraphic score with visual slides; 1973)

Vocal 
Piano Ritual I (voice, piano, Chinese woodblock and gong)
Songs (voice and guitar; 1964–1972)

References 

1947 births
Living people
American composers
American women composers
21st-century American women